Louis-Philippe Mercier was a politician from Quebec, Canada.

Background

He was born on September 4, 1877 in Fraserville, Quebec (now Rivière-du-Loup). He was a notary public and a senior army officer of the local military reserve.

Member of the legislature

He ran as a Liberal candidate in a 1921 provincial by-election in the district of Trois-Rivières and won, succeeding Joseph-Adolphe Tessier who had recently died.

Mercier was re-elected in 1923, but was defeated by Conservative rising political star Maurice Duplessis in 1927.

Retirement from Politics

Mercier was sheriff of Trois-Rivières from 1931 until his death.  He died on March 16, 1961.

Footnotes

1877 births
1961 deaths
People from Rivière-du-Loup
Quebec Liberal Party MNAs